Roland Vrabec (born 6 March 1974) is a German football manager. He was most recently the manager of Esbjerg fB.

Personal life
Vrabec played as a teenager at the Frankfurt district club Spvgg 05 Oberrad and as a senior in amateur status at SG Croatia Frankfurt. With his club he played in the former Bundesliga league Hessen and then Football Hessenliga. Already at the age of 26, he ended his active career in order to devote himself to further education as a sports science expert with a focus on sports medicine and training. Vrabec studied from 2000 at the Institute of Psychology and Sports Science (IFS) of the Johann Wolfgang Goethe University Frankfurt. He completed his training at the Hennes Weisweiler Academy in Hennef.

Career
Vrabec's previous coaching stations were from 2001 initially the youth area of the FSV Frankfurt, the 1st FSV Mainz 05 and an assistant seniors at the 1st FC Lokomotive Leipzig from 2012 to 2013. From 2011 to 2013 he was co-coach of the U-18 teams at the DFB in cooperation with Christian Ziege and Horst Hrubesch.

From summer 2013, he worked as an assistant coach of FC St. Pauli. On 6 November 2013, he moved as a former assistant coach on the side of Michael Frontzeck after his leave of absence in the role of head coach at FC St. Pauli. He should first lead the team in the 2nd Bundesliga until the winter break of the 2013/14 season. This was considered a steep coaching career of a "nameless" player and coach in German professional football and was the philosophy and financial planning of the club FC St. Pauli owed. At the beginning of the winter break 2013/14 he extended his contract as head coach until 30 June 2015. After a weak start of the team in the 2014/15 season, he was on 3 September 2014 as a coach of FC St. Pauli leave.

In January 2015, Vrabec co-coach of Markus Babbel at Lucerne in the Swiss Super League. On 22 February 2016, he was released immediately at FC Lucerne. For the season 2016/17 he was new coach at the third division FSV Frankfurt.

On his 43rd birthday, the FSV Frankfurt released him immediately. About two weeks later, he was introduced as the new coach of FC Vaduz. He failed to keep FC Vaduz in the Swiss Super League. He won his first trophy in Liechtenstein Football Cup.

He was announced as the new coach of Progrès Niederkorn on 12 June 2019. He was sacked by the club in November 2020.

On 11 August he was named the successor of Peter Hyballa as manager of the Danish 1st Division club Esbjerg fB. He was sacked in March 2022 with the club only 3 points above the relegation zone.

Honours
FC Vaduz
Liechtenstein Football Cup (2): 2016–17, 2017–18

References

External links
Profile at scoreway.com

1974 births
German football managers
Living people
Sportspeople from Frankfurt
FC St. Pauli managers
FSV Frankfurt managers
3. Liga managers
1. FSV Mainz 05 II managers
FC Progrès Niederkorn managers
Esbjerg fB managers
FC Vaduz managers